Outremont Theatre is a theatre in Montreal, Quebec, Canada. It is located on Bernard Avenue West in the borough of Outremont.

History

The Outremont Theatre was built in 1928 based on plans by architect René Charbonneau. It opened the following year.

The theatre operated both as a movie theatre and a concert hall.

Musicians who have performed at the Outremont Theatre include: Pauline Julien, Louise Forestier, Félix Leclerc, Diane Dufresne, as Paul Piché, Richard Séguin, Tom Waits and The Beautiful South.

The theatre closed its doors in the early 1990s. It was purchased by the city of Outremont in 1994, in order to restore the theater which was recognized as a National Historic Site of Canada the previous year. Following the renovations, it reopened on March 20, 2001.

It was listed as a historic monument by the city of Outremont June 29, 1987. It was designated a National Historic Site of Canada on November 20, 1993 and as a historic monument by the Répertoire du patrimoine culturel du Québec on June 28, 1994.

References

External links
 

Theatres in Montreal
Theatres completed in 1929
National Historic Sites in Quebec
Art Deco architecture in Canada
Outremont, Quebec
Atmospheric theatres
Cinemas and movie theatres in Quebec
Repertory cinemas
Theatres on the National Historic Sites of Canada register
Heritage buildings of Quebec
1929 establishments in Quebec